Philip St. John Basil Rathbone MC (13 June 1892 – 21 July 1967) was a South African-born English actor. He rose to prominence in the United Kingdom as a Shakespearean stage actor and went on to appear in more than 70 films, primarily costume dramas, swashbucklers, and, occasionally, horror films.

Rathbone frequently portrayed suave villains or morally ambiguous characters, such as Mr. Murdstone in David Copperfield (1935), Tybalt in Romeo and Juliet (1936) and Sir Guy of Gisbourne in The Adventures of Robin Hood (1938). His most famous role was that of Sherlock Holmes in fourteen Hollywood films made between 1939 and 1946 and in a radio series. His later career included roles on Broadway, as well as self-ironic film and television work. He received a Tony Award in 1948 as Best Actor in a Play. He was also nominated for two Academy Awards and was honoured with three stars on the Hollywood Walk of Fame.

Early life
Rathbone was born in Johannesburg, South African Republic, to British parents. His mother, Anna Barbara (née George), was a violinist, and his father, Edgar Philip Rathbone, was a mining engineer and scion of the Liverpool Rathbone family. He had two older half-brothers, Harold and Horace, as well as two younger siblings, Beatrice and John. Basil was the great-grandson of the noted Victorian philanthropist, William Rathbone V, and thus a descendant of William Rathbone II. 

The Rathbones fled to Britain when Basil was three years old after his father was accused by the Boers of being a spy following the Jameson Raid. Rathbone attended Repton School in Derbyshire from 1906 to 1910, where he excelled at sports and was given the nickname "Ratters" by schoolmates. Thereafter, he was briefly employed as an insurance clerk by the Liverpool and Globe Insurance Companies, to appease his father's wish for him to have a conventional career.

On 22 April 1911, Rathbone made his first appearance on stage at the Theatre Royal, Ipswich, Suffolk, as Hortensio in The Taming of the Shrew, with his cousin Sir Frank Benson's No. 2 Company, under the direction of Henry Herbert. In October 1912, he went to the United States with Benson's company, playing roles such as Paris in Romeo and Juliet, Fenton in The Merry Wives of Windsor, and Silvius in As You Like It. Returning to Britain, he made his first appearance in London at the Savoy Theatre on 9 July 1914, as Finch in The Sin of David. That December, he appeared at the Shaftesbury Theatre as the Dauphin in Henry V. During 1915, he toured with Benson and appeared with him at London's Court Theatre in December as Lysander in A Midsummer Night's Dream.

Military service
During the First World War, Rathbone was called up in 1915 via the Derby Scheme into the British Army as a private with the London Scottish Regiment, joining a regiment that also included his future professional acting contemporaries Claude Rains, Herbert Marshall and Ronald Colman at different points through the conflict. After basic training with the London Scots in early 1916 he received a commission as a lieutenant in the 2/10th Battalion of the King's Liverpool Regiment (Liverpool Scottish), where he served as an intelligence officer and attained the rank of captain. Rathbone was twice the British Army Fencing Champion, a skill that served him well in movies and allowed him to even teach actors Errol Flynn and Tyrone Power swordsmanship. Rathbone's younger brother John was killed in action on 4 June 1918. In 2012 two letters Rathbone wrote to his family while serving on the Western Front were published. One reveals the anguish and anger he felt following the death of his brother, John:

 I want to tell him to mind his place. I think of his ridiculous belief that everything would always be well, his ever-hopeful smile, and I want to cuff him for a little fool. He had no business to let it happen and it maddens me that I shall never be able to tell him so, or change it or bring him back. I can’t think of him without being consumed with anger at him for being dead and beyond anything I can do to him.
— 26 July 1918

Following his brother's death, Rathbone appears to have become unconcerned about the dangers of serving at the front. Author Richard Van Emden in Famous 1914–18 speculates that his extreme bravery may have been a form of guilt or need for vengeance. He persuaded his superiors to allow him to scout enemy positions during daylight rather than at night, as was the usual practice to minimise the chance of detection. Rathbone wore a special camouflage suit that resembled a tree with a wreath of freshly plucked foliage on his head with burnt cork applied to his hands and face. As a result of these highly dangerous daylight reconnaissance missions in September 1918, he was awarded the Military Cross for "conspicuous daring and resource on patrol".

Career

During the Summer Festival of 1919, he appeared at Stratford-upon-Avon with the New Shakespeare Company playing Romeo, Cassius, Ferdinand in The Tempest and Florizel in The Winter's Tale; in October he was at London's Queen's Theatre as the aide de camp in Napoleon, and in February 1920 he was at the Savoy Theatre in the title role in Peter Ibbetson with huge success.

During the 1920s, Rathbone appeared regularly in Shakespearean and other roles on the British stage. He began to travel and appeared at the Cort Theatre, New York, in October 1923 in a production of Molnár's play The Swan opposite Eva Le Gallienne, which made him a star on Broadway. He toured in the United States in 1925, appearing in San Francisco in May and the Lyceum Theatre, New York, in October. He was in the US again in 1927 and 1930 and again in 1931, when he appeared on stage with Ethel Barrymore. He continued his stage career in Britain, returning late in 1934 to the US, where he appeared with Katharine Cornell in several plays.

Rathbone was once arrested in 1926 along with every other member of the cast of The Captive, a play in which his character's wife left him for another woman. Though the charges were eventually dropped, Rathbone was very angry about the censorship because he believed that homosexuality needed to be brought into the open.

He commenced his film career in Hollywood in 1921 in silent movies and appeared in 1923's "School for Scandal", and in The Masked Bride, plus a few other silents. He portrayed detective Philo Vance in the 1930 film The Bishop Murder Case, based on the best selling novel. In the film there is a coincidental reference to Sherlock Holmes. Like George Sanders and Vincent Price after him, Rathbone made a name for himself in the 1930s by playing suave villains in costume dramas and swashbucklers, including David Copperfield (1935) as the abusive stepfather Mr. Murdstone; Anna Karenina (1935) as her distant husband, Karenin; The Last Days of Pompeii (1935) as Pontius Pilate; Captain Blood (1935); A Tale of Two Cities (1935), as the Marquis St. Evremonde; The Adventures of Robin Hood (1938) playing his best-remembered villain, Sir Guy of Gisbourne; The Adventures of Marco Polo (1938); and The Mark of Zorro (1940) as Captain Esteban Pasquale. He also appeared in several early horror films: Tower of London (1939), as Richard III, and Son of Frankenstein (1939), portraying the dedicated surgeon Baron Wolf von Frankenstein, son of the monster's creator, and, in 1949, was also the narrator for the segment "The Wind in the Willows" in the Disney animated feature, The Adventures of Ichabod and Mr. Toad.

He was admired for his athletic swordsmanship (he listed fencing among his favourite recreations). He fought and lost to Errol Flynn in a duel on the beach in Captain Blood and in an elaborate fight sequence in The Adventures of Robin Hood. He was also involved in noteworthy sword fights in Tower of London, The Mark of Zorro, and The Court Jester (1956). Despite his real life skill, Rathbone only twice played characters who won on screen, against John Barrymore in Romeo and Juliet (1936) and short, rotund, middle-aged Eugene Pallette in The Mark of Zorro (1940). Rathbone earned Academy Award nominations for Best Actor in a Supporting Role for his performances as Tybalt in Romeo and Juliet (1936) and as King Louis XI in If I Were King (1938), a truly remarkable, comedic performance as the wily king. In The Dawn Patrol (1938), he played one of his few heroic roles in the 1930s, as a Royal Flying Corps (RFC) squadron commander brought to the brink of a nervous breakdown by the strain and guilt of sending his battle-weary pilots off to near-certain death in the skies of 1915 France. Errol Flynn, Rathbone's perennial foe, starred in the film as his successor when Rathbone's character was promoted.

According to Hollywood legend, Rathbone was Margaret Mitchell's first choice to play Rhett Butler in the film version of her novel Gone with the Wind. Rathbone actively campaigned for the role.

Despite his film success, Rathbone always insisted that he wished to be remembered for his stage career. He said that his favourite role was Romeo.

The Sherlock Holmes films

Rathbone is most widely recognised for his many portrayals of Sherlock Holmes. In a radio interview, Rathbone recalled that Twentieth Century-Fox producer and director Gene Markey, lunching with producer-director-actor Gregory Ratoff and 20th Century-Fox mogul Daryl Zanuck at Lucey's Restaurant in Hollywood, proposed a film version of Sir Arthur Conan Doyle's The Hound of the Baskervilles. When asked who could possibly play Holmes, Markey incredulously replied "Who?! Basil Rathbone!" The film was so successful that Fox produced a sequel that appeared later in 1939. Interest in Holmes cooled at Fox, but Universal Pictures picked up the character, and 12 feature films were made between 1941 and 1944 for release until 1947, all of which co-starred Nigel Bruce as Dr. Watson.

The first two films, The Hound of the Baskervilles and The Adventures of Sherlock Holmes (both produced by Fox in 1939), were set in the late Victorian times of the original stories. The later instalments, produced by Universal, beginning with Sherlock Holmes and the Voice of Terror (1942), were set in contemporary times, with the first three having World War II-related plots.

Concurrent with the films, Rathbone and Bruce reprised their film roles in the radio series The New Adventures of Sherlock Holmes, which began in October 1939. Rathbone appeared in the radio series as long as the film series was active, but after the films lapsed in 1946, Rathbone ceded his radio part to Tom Conway. Conway and Bruce carried on with the series for two seasons, until both dropped out in July 1947.

The many Holmes sequels typecast Rathbone, and he was unable to become free from the shadow of the Great Detective despite appearing in other film roles. Resenting the typecasting, Rathbone refused to renew his contract at Metro-Goldwyn-Mayer and returned to Broadway. In later years, Rathbone willingly made the Holmes association, as in a TV sketch with Milton Berle in the early 1950s, in which he donned the deerstalker cap and Inverness cape. In the 1960s, dressed as Holmes, he appeared in a series of TV commercials for Getz Exterminators ("Getz gets 'em, since 1888!'").

Rathbone also brought Holmes to the stage in a play written by his wife Ouida. Thomas Gomez, who had appeared as a Nazi ringleader in Sherlock Holmes and the Voice of Terror, played the villainous Professor Moriarty. Nigel Bruce was slated to portray Dr Watson once more but became too ill and the part was played by character actor Jack Raine. Bruce's absence depressed Rathbone, particularly after Bruce died on 8 October 1953, while the play was in rehearsals. The play ran for only three performances.

Later career
In the 1950s, Rathbone appeared in two spoofs of his earlier swashbuckling villains: Casanova's Big Night (1954) opposite Bob Hope and The Court Jester (1956) with Danny Kaye. He appeared frequently on TV game shows and continued to appear in major films, including the Humphrey Bogart comedy We're No Angels (1955) and John Ford's political drama The Last Hurrah (1958).

Rathbone also appeared on Broadway numerous times in this period. In 1948, he won a Tony Award for Best Actor for his performance as the unyielding Dr. Austin Sloper in the original production of The Heiress, which featured Wendy Hiller as his timid, spinster daughter. He also received accolades for his performance in Archibald Macleish's J.B., a modernisation of the Biblical trials of Job.

Through the 1950s and 1960s, he continued to appear in several dignified anthology programmes on television. To support his second wife's lavish tastes, he appeared as a panelist on the television game show The Name's the Same (in 1954), and he took roles in cheap film thrillers of far lesser quality, such as The Black Sleep (1956), Queen of Blood (1966), The Ghost in the Invisible Bikini (1966, wherein the character 'Eric Von Zipper' played by Harvey Lembeck jokes, "That guy looks like Sherlock Holmes"), Hillbillys in a Haunted House (1967, also featuring Lon Chaney Jr and John Carradine), and his last film, a low-budget, horror film called Autopsy of a Ghost (1968).

He is also known for his spoken word recordings, including his interpretation of Clement C. Moore's "The Night Before Christmas". Rathbone's readings of the stories and poems of Edgar Allan Poe are collected together with readings by Vincent Price in Caedmon Audio's The Edgar Allan Poe Audio Collection on CD.

In four Caedmon albums, Rathbone revisited his characterization of Sherlock Holmes. The first, "The Speckled Band" (Caedmon Records TC 1172, recorded in 1963), is a straight narration of the tale. In the rest, he changes his voice for each character, including a rendition of Nigel Bruce as Dr. Watson.

Rathbone also made many other recordings, including Oliver Twist, Prokofiev's Peter and the Wolf (with Leopold Stokowski conducting), and Charles Dickens's A Christmas Carol.

On television, he appeared in two musical versions of Dickens's A Christmas Carol: one in 1954, in which he played Marley's Ghost opposite Fredric March's Scrooge, and the original 1956 live action version of The Stingiest Man In Town, in which he starred as a singing Ebenezer Scrooge.

In the 1960s, he toured with a one-man show, In and Out of Character (the same title as his autobiography). He recited poetry and Shakespeare, accented by reminiscences from his life and career (including  the humorous, "I could have killed Errol Flynn any time I wanted to!"). As an encore, he recited "221B" a poem written by writer-critic Vincent Starrett, one of the preeminent members of the Baker Street Irregulars whom Rathbone held in high regard.

Price and Rathbone appeared together, along with Boris Karloff, in Tower of London (1939) and The Comedy of Terrors (1963). The latter was the only film to feature the "Big Four" of American International Pictures' horror films: Price, Rathbone, Karloff and Peter Lorre. Rathbone appeared with Price in the final segment of Roger Corman's 1962 anthology film Tales of Terror, a loose dramatisation of Poe's "The Facts in the Case of M. Valdemar".

In 1965, Belmont Books issued the anthology Basil Rathbone Selects Strange Tales, a collection of horror stories by Poe, Hawthorne, Bulwer-Lytton, Charles Dickens, Allston Collins, Le Fanu, and Wilkie Collins. The volume features a cover portrait of Rathbone; however, the back cover's legend "Produced by Lyle Kenyon Engel" indicates the anthology probably was not edited by Rathbone. Canadian editor and book packager Engel packaged shows and magazines for other horror stars, including Boris Karloff.

Basil Rathbone has three stars on the Hollywood Walk of Fame: one for films at 6549 Hollywood Boulevard; one for radio at 6300 Hollywood Boulevard; and one for television at 6915 Hollywood Boulevard in Hollywood.

Personal life
Rathbone married actress Ethel Marion Foreman (1887–1976) in 1914. They had one son, Rodion Rathbone (1915–1996), who had a brief Hollywood career under the name John Rodion. The couple divorced in 1926. In the same year, he married writer Ouida Bergère; their infant child died in 1928. In 1939 the couple adopted a daughter, Cynthia Rathbone (1939–1969). The American actor Jackson Rathbone is a distant relation.

Basil Rathbone was a first cousin once-removed of the British campaigning independent MP Eleanor Rathbone. He was the cousin of actor Frank Benson, to whom he bore a strong resemblance.

During Rathbone's Hollywood career, Ouida Rathbone, who was also her husband's business manager, developed a reputation for hosting elaborate and expensive parties in their home, with many prominent and influential people on the guest lists. This trend inspired a joke in The Ghost Breakers (1940), a film in which Rathbone does not appear: During a tremendous thunderstorm in New York City, Bob Hope observes that "Basil Rathbone must be throwing a party". Actress Mrs Patrick Campbell described Rathbone as "two profiles pasted together". As cited in the same autobiography, Mrs Campbell later referred to him as "a folded umbrella taking elocution lessons".

He was a devout Episcopalian and a member of the Episcopal Actors Guild.

Death
Rathbone died suddenly of a heart attack in New York City on 21 July 1967 at the age of 75. His body was interred in a crypt in the Shrine of Memories Mausoleum at Ferncliff Cemetery in Hartsdale, New York.

Filmography

Radio appearances

See also

 List of actors with Academy Award nominations

References

Further reading

External links

 
 
 
 Biography
 Basil Rathbone at Virtual History
 Basil Rathbone bio on (re)Search my Trash

1892 births
1967 deaths
20th-century English male actors
Audiobook narrators
British Army personnel of World War I
British expatriate male actors in the United States
Burials at Ferncliff Cemetery
English Anglicans
English male film actors
English male stage actors
English male radio actors
English male Shakespearean actors
English male television actors
English male voice actors
Expatriates of the United Kingdom in the South African Republic
London Scottish soldiers
Liverpool Scottish officers
Male actors from Johannesburg
Metro-Goldwyn-Mayer contract players
People educated at Repton School
Basil
Recipients of the Military Cross
Tony Award winners
Universal Pictures contract players